A thoroughfare is a primary passage or way as a transit route through regularly trafficked areas, whether by road on dry land or, by extension, via watercraft or aircraft. On land, a thoroughfare may refer to anything from a multi-lane highway with grade-separated junctions to a rough trail. Thoroughfares are used by a variety of traffic, such as cars, as well as pedestrians on roads and highways. On water, a thoroughfare may refer to a strait, channel, or waterway. The term may also refer to access to a route, distinct from the route itself. Thus, thoroughfare may refer to the legal right to use a particular way.

Different terms
Highways, public or private road or other public way on land
Roads, route or way on land between two places that has been paved or otherwise improved for travel
Bridle path, for equestrian use
Cycleway, for use by cyclists
Footpath, for use only by pedestrians
Foreshoreway, a greenway along the edge of the sea, open to both walkers and cyclists
Greenway, a wilderness area intended for "passive use"
Hiking trail, trails (footpaths), in the countryside
Long-distance trails, recreational trail mainly through rural areas used for hiking, backpacking, cycling, horse riding or cross-country skiing
Right of way, an easement on a piece of land
Running course, a footway used by runners
Sidewalk, a path for people to walk along the side of a road
Snowshoe trail, a snow trail to be navigated by pedestrians in snowshoes
Towpath, a path along a canal or river used for towing a boat
Traffic circle, a type of intersection that directs both turning and through traffic onto a one-way circular roadway
Trail/Track, a rough path through more wild or remote territory
Many other types of road
On water, a heavily trafficked route through a strait or channel.
Street
Stroad

See also 

Way (disambiguation)

References

Water transport
Types of thoroughfares
Routes